Yukarıçamurdere is a village in the Çayırlı District, Erzincan Province, Turkey. The village is populated by Kurds of the Arel tribe and had a population of 75 in 2021.

References 

Villages in Çayırlı District
Kurdish settlements in Erzincan Province